Denise Gilligan is a camogie player, scorer of two goals for Galway in their breakthrough 1996 All Ireland final victory over Cork.

Career
In 1998 she almost repeated the goal-scoring performance when Galway lost to Cork in the last 12-a-side final, sending a late goal chance inches wide. A year later the goal would have counted under expanded goal measurements! She scored a goal and two points as Galway won a National League medal in 2002. After moving to London in 2008 she played with the London camogie team.

Denise joined Tara Camogie Club of London and helped Tara win Senior Championships in 2009 and 2010. She has captained the team; won the Player of the Match Award 2010 as well as numerous Club Awards.

References

External links
 Camogie.ie Official Camogie Association Website
 Wikipedia List of Camogie players
 - Tara Camogie London Website

Year of birth missing (living people)
Living people
Galway camogie players